Dawn man may refer to:

 Piltdown Man, an early 20th-century paleoanthropological hoax
Any archaic human species

See also 
 Dawn Man theory, theory inspired by the Piltdown Man
 Dawn's Men, a neolithic stone circle in Cornwall, England
 Ancient humans (disambiguation)
 First man or woman (disambiguation)